Osteochilus sarawakensis is a species of cyprinid fish. It is endemic to northern Borneo and occurs in Malaysia (Sarawak and Sabah) and in Brunei. It occurs in mountain streams in the upper reaches of river basins with forested vegetation, clear water, and rapid current.

References

Osteochilus
Endemic fauna of Borneo
Freshwater fish of Borneo
Freshwater fish of Malaysia
Fauna of Brunei
Taxa named by Jaranthada Karnasuta
Fish described in 1993